, son of Iemoto, was a kugyō or Japanese court noble of the Kamakura period (1185–1333). He did not hold regent positions kampaku and sessho. Mototsugu was his son.

References

Fujiwara clan
Konoe family
1287 births
1318 deaths
People of Kamakura-period Japan